Theodore David Chuang (born October 17, 1969) is a  United States district judge of the United States District Court for the District of Maryland and former Deputy General Counsel of the United States Department of Homeland Security.

Early life
Chuang was born in Media, Pennsylvania, in 1969. His parents are immigrants from Taiwan. Chuang earned a B.A. summa cum laude from Harvard College in 1991; as an undergraduate, he wrote for the Harvard Crimson. He went on to earn a J.D. magna cum laude from Harvard Law School in 1994. As a law student, he served as an editor of the Harvard Law Review. He is married and has two daughters.

Legal career
Chuang began his legal career as a law clerk for Judge Dorothy W. Nelson of the United States Court of Appeals for the Ninth Circuit, from 1994 to 1995. From 1995 to 1998, he served as a trial attorney in the Civil Rights Division of the United States Department of Justice. From 1998 to 2004, he served as an Assistant United States Attorney in the District of Massachusetts. He served as counsel at the law firm of Wilmer, Cutler, Pickering, Hale and Dorr LLP in Washington, D.C. from 2004 to 2007. From 2007 to 2009, he was Deputy Chief Investigative Counsel for the House Oversight and Government Reform Committee. In 2009, he was Chief Investigative Counsel for the House Committee on Energy and Commerce. From 2009 until his confirmation as a federal judge in 2014, he served as Deputy General Counsel of the United States Department of Homeland Security.

Federal judicial service
On September 25, 2013, President Barack Obama nominated Chuang to serve as a United States District Judge of the United States District Court for the District of Maryland, to the seat being vacated by Judge Roger W. Titus, who assumed senior status on January 17, 2014. Chuang's nomination was strongly supported by Maryland's two U.S. senators, Ben Cardin and Barbara Mikulski. He was rated "well-qualified" by the American Bar Association's Standing Committee on the Federal Judiciary. On January 16, 2014, his nomination was reported out of the Senate Judiciary Committee by a 10–8 vote. On April 29, 2014, Senate Majority Leader Harry Reid filed for cloture on Chuang's nomination. On May 1, 2014, the Senate voted 54–43 on the motion to invoke cloture. Later that day, the Senate voted 53–42 to confirm Chuang. He received his judicial commission on May 2, 2014. Chuang sits in Greenbelt, Maryland.

Notable rulings 

On July 13, 2020, Chuang suspended the in-person requirement for women wanting to obtain the abortion pill mifepristone during the COVID-19 epidemic due to public health risks. Chuang affirmed the decision in December 2020 when the Trump administration requested to reinstate that requirement. However, the Supreme Court of the United States subsequently overruled Chuang's decision 6-3, therefore requiring women to obtain the pills in person until at least the end of the Trump presidency.

See also
List of Asian American jurists
List of first minority male lawyers and judges in Maryland

References

External links

1969 births
21st-century American judges
American jurists of Taiwanese descent
American people of Taiwanese descent
Assistant United States Attorneys
Harvard Law School alumni
Judges of the United States District Court for the District of Maryland
Living people
Maryland lawyers
United States Department of Homeland Security officials
United States district court judges appointed by Barack Obama
People from Media, Pennsylvania
20th-century American lawyers
21st-century American lawyers
Wilmer Cutler Pickering Hale and Dorr people
Harvard College alumni
The Harvard Crimson people